Milojko "Mickey" Spajić (born 24 September 1987) is a Montenegrin politician, financial engineer and the Minister of Finance and Social Welfare in the Government of Montenegro and the cabinet of Zdravko Krivokapić.

Biography

Early life and education
Spajić was born in 1988 to a Serb family in Pljevlja, which was then part of the Socialist Federal Republic of Yugoslavia. He graduated from Pljevlja Gymnasium as one of the best students and continued his education at the Osaka University in Japan, where he studied ecometrics in Japanese as a scholarship holder of the Government of Japan. As part of the exchange, he also studied at the Tsinghua University. He obtained his master's degree, also as a scholarship holder, in France at the HEC Paris business school, which according to some research is the number one school in Europe.

In addition to his mother tongue Serbian, he also speaks 5 world languages.

After school, he worked in the United States on Wall Street, in Paris and Tokyo. Before coming back to Montenegro to make his knowledge available to the state during the summer of 2020, he also worked for Goldman Sachs, a global banking group dealing with investment banking, securities trading and other financial services, primarily with institutional clients. He has also been a partner of the Venture Capital Fund in Singapore for the past four years.

Political career
Spajić is a non-partisan person and during the parliamentary elections in 2020, he was a member of Zdravko Krivokapić's expert team. Spajic stated that there were several reasons for his return to Montenegro, but that the main one was the adoption of the disputed Law on Freedom of Religion and that the law shows how many problems have accumulated in the Montenegrin system. He added that until the situation improves, he will not "move" from Montenegro and that no investor will believe in a state where an institution such as the Serbian Orthodox Church, which has existed for eight centuries and is trusted by most Montenegrin citizens is getting its property seized by the government. During the religious crisis, he participated in lobbying in the United States for interests of the Serbian Orthodox Church and the Serbs of Montenegro.

Spajic was nominated for Minister of Finance and Social Welfare on 5 November 2020. Following a parliamentary crisis, Prime Minister Krivokapić announced that he had submitted an initiative to the Parliament of Montenegro to remove Deputy Prime Minister Dritan Abazović and proposed that Spajić replaces him as the deputy prime minister.

External links 
 U ZIZI – Zdravko Krivokapić and Milojko Spajić (in Serbian)

References 

1988 births
Living people
People from Pljevlja
Serbs of Montenegro
Members of the Serbian Orthodox Church
Osaka University alumni
HEC Paris alumni
Finance ministers of Montenegro
Montenegrin businesspeople